Svetislav "Bule" Goncić (born 5 May 1960) is a Serbian actor. He has appeared in more than seventy films since 1971.

Selected filmography

References

External links 

1960 births
Living people
People from Kladovo
Serbian male film actors
Serbian male child actors